In terms of knowledge representation, a living graph (also referred to as a "lifeline", "living timeline" or "fortune line".) is a graph similar to a chronology timeline which places events along a horizontal axis, while the vertical axis is used to represent factors such as an emotional reaction to those events, or the event's relative importance, its success or failure, danger/safety, etc. The choices are endless. In this sense they have been described as being "timelines with attitude". Their main use appears to be as teaching aids. The student is encouraged to look at historical events from a particular perspective in order to aid understanding.

References

External links
Interactive Living Graph Templates in Flash
FACE Living Graph Exercise

Knowledge representation
Diagrams
Quality control tools